The 1995 Leekes British Open Championships was held at the Cardiff International Arena from 19–26 March 1995. Jansher Khan won his fourth consecutive title defeating Peter Marshall in the final.

Seeds

Draw and results

Final Qualifying round

Main draw

References

Men's British Open Squash Championships
Men's British Open
Men's British Open Squash Championship
Men's British Open Squash Championship
1990s in Cardiff
Sports competitions in Cardiff